Special Force (named Soldier Front in North America) is an online free-to-play first-person shooter game developed by the South Korean game developer "Dragonfly".

Gameplay
Special Force provides several game modes including team battle (bomb planting, escaping, object stealing, etc.), single battle, team death match, and horror mode. Most modes consist of a red team and a blue team, with the exceptions of a single battle, training, and horror mode. The game allows for a maximum of 16 users to be in the same room playing together.

Players can purchase and utilize a range of character forces, including French GIGN, German GSG 9, Malaysian PASKAL, Republic of Korea Marine Corps, US Army Delta Force, and Russian Spetsnaz. Players may also rent equipment for speed and armor. Various modern-themed weapons are available. Weapons have durability and must be repaired often. Weapons cannot be modified like in other first-person shooters, but once they are purchased, they are permanent and stay in the inventory until the player sells them.

Players rank up after receiving enough experience points, gained after each match, with bonus rewards at certain ranks.

Graphics update
On July 14, 2009, Dragonfly provided a patch to the Korean version which consisted of a redesigned UI and reorganized game items for the celebration of the game's 5th anniversary. Along with this, many of the older weapons graphics were updated. This patch was applied to all other versions of the game in the following months.

Game Modes
Special Force currently has 11 modes available in the North American version of the game.
 Training – Targets are placed everywhere on the map for players to shoot down. This mode is used for practicing aims and strategies.
 Single Battle – A free for all mode, the first player who reaches the set number of points wins.
 Team Battle – Red team must complete the objective while the blue team must stop the red team. Depending on the map, the objective could be planting the bomb, escaping the map, or retrieving an object.
 Clan Battle – Same as Team Battle except the red team must be all from the same clan and the same goes for the blue team. Clans are not able to face each other. This mode is often played in 5 vs 5.
 Team Death Match – The team that reaches 100 points first wins the round. Each kill grants 2 points and special kills will grant extra points.
 CTC – One player from each team is selected as the Captain who will be granted extra HP, along with an oversized head. The team to defeat the opponent's Captain wins the round.
 CTC 2 – Similar to CTC, except every player will be a Captain. The team to defeat all the Captains on the opposing team wins the round.
 Horror Mode – In each round, some players are selected as zombies. Zombies must kill all humans while humans try to stay alive until the time limit is up. Humans that get killed before the time limit will turn into a zombie. Zombies win the round if no humans are left alive while humans win the round when at least one survives by the time limit.
 Sniper – Players are only allowed to use sniper rifles and knives on this mode's exclusive maps. The team that kills all the opposing team members wins the round. With a premium item, there is an option to allow secondary weapons.
 Rage Mode – The team that reaches the target points first wins the match. Every time a player is killed, their rage meter increases. Once the rage meter is maxed, the player is given extra HP in order to take revenge.
 Horror Mode 2 – Teams switch from zombies and players each round. The team that reaches the target points first wins the round. There are additional zombies compared to Horror Mode.
 Pirate Mode – To win a player must get 500 points and conquer each of the treasures.
The game modes of Single Battle, Team Battle, and Clan Battle offer the option of restricting weapons to sniper rifles only, but this feature requires the host to have a premium item.

Sequel
The second iteration of the game, Special Force II, uses Unreal Engine 3. Aeria Games announced in March 2013 that Special Force 2 would be released in the North American market as Soldier Front 2, in August 2015 Aeria Games closed the North American version of the game, and in October 2016 the publishing rights for the North American version of the game were handed to Gameforge and the game was re-released in North America under the same name as other regions. The European and North American versions of the game were owned by Gameforge until August 20, 2018, when the North American and European versions of the game were closed.

Professional leagues
S.K.I.L.L. – Special Force 2 is a professional league run by Electronic Sports League in Western Europe that began in 2013. The Special Force II Pro League in Taiwan that is run by Taiwan eSports League and broadcast on Fox Sports 3. The inaugural season kicked off on October 2, 2015.

See also
 ijji
 Aeria Games and Entertainment

External links
 Dragonfly Homepage

References

2004 video games
First-person shooter multiplayer online games
First-person shooters
Freeware games
Ijji
Multiplayer video games
Video games about bomb disposal
Video games about Delta Force
Video games about police officers
Video games about the Special Air Service
Video games about the United States Marine Corps
Video games developed in South Korea
Windows games
Windows-only games
Esports games
Aeria Games games
Asiasoft games